Field Marshal Chaophraya Surasakmontri, sometimes spelled as Chao Phraya Surasak (1851–1931) was a Thai field marshal, nobleman, and businessman. He was best known in Haw wars campaign.

He served as Commander of the Department of the Army from 1890-1892, and as Minister of Ministry of Agriculture afterwards.  He established a sawmill in Si Racha in 1900.

The city of Chaophraya Surasak, in Chonburi is named after him.

References

Chaophraya
1851 births
1931 deaths
Field marshals of Thailand
Commanders-in-chief of the Royal Thai Army
Ministers of Agriculture and Cooperatives of Thailand
Members of the Privy Council of Thailand
Chaophraya